Linus Gabriel Sebastian (born August 20, 1986) is a Canadian YouTuber. Sebastian is best known for creating and hosting YouTube channels that cover technology, especially Linus Tech Tips (LTT). His channels have a combined subscriber base of over 25 million.  

From 2007 to 2013, he was a regular presenter of technology videos for the now defunct Canadian computer retailer NCIX. He is also the founder of Linus Media Group Inc. and has served as its CEO since 2013.

, Linus Tech Tips is the most-watched technology channel on YouTube. In 2014, Tubefilter named the channel as being within the "top 1% of Google's preferred advertising channels" on YouTube for the technology category. In 2015, Inc. magazine ranked Sebastian fourth in a list of the "Top 30 Power Players in Tech".

Career

NCIX and Linus Tech Tips 

Sebastian was working for the now-defunct Canadian online computer store NCIX. He was asked by the company to be the host for its technology channel, which was created to help demonstrate products. Sebastian was assisted by an unidentified cameraperson and editor, and worked with limited resources, shooting videos with a camera borrowed from the son of the company's president.

Due to high costs and low viewership during the early days of the channel, Sebastian was instructed to create the Linus Tech Tips channel as a cheaper offshoot of the NCIX channel, to allow for lower production values without affecting the NCIX brand. He described TigerDirect and Newegg as competitors. Linus Tech Tips was created on November 24, 2008. He eventually left NCIX following a dispute regarding company management, negotiating an agreement in which he could keep the channel as long as he signed a non-compete clause.

Linus Media Group 
Sebastian founded Linus Media Group (LMG) in January 2013 out of a garage. The group developed the Linus Tech Tips channel as an independent venture. LMG is headquartered in Surrey, British Columbia, Canada.  it has over 80 full-time employees. Since 2017, LMG has hosted an annual event known as the LTX Expo, a "convention featuring tech-focused content creators and personalities".  Creator Warehouse is a merchandise company founded by Sebastian that creates and sells LMG branded apparel. Floatplane is an online streaming service founded by Sebastian that offers creators a platform to upload and monetize their content. One of its main selling points is its support for higher bit rate compared to YouTube. All videos are behind a paywall.

Notable videos 
On January 2, 2016, Linus Tech Tips released a video demonstrating a computer capable of supporting seven individual users at once, with an estimated total cost of $30,000. The video made technology news on a number of websites. In August 2017, the Linus Tech Tips channel uploaded a two part video where they were able to game at 16K resolution (15360 by 8640 pixels) using 16 4K monitors in a 4 by 4 configuration.

In April 2018, the Linus Tech Tips channel uploaded a video claiming that Apple refused to repair Sebastian's iMac Pro after Linus Tech Tips staff damaged it in a product teardown, a refusal that VentureBeat speculated is illegal. In December 2018, Linus Tech Tips released a four-part series detailing their experience buying a gaming PC from 6 systems integrators representing 3 different market tiers. The series has gained over 12 million views and was covered in PC Gamer.

In 2021, Linus Tech Tips released a three-part series showing the process of making an 18-carat gold Xbox Series X controller. The first video showed the prototyping, the second the making of the gold shells, and the third the reactions of employees at their headquarters.

YouTube channels 
LinusTechTips
LinusCatTips
Techquickie
ShortCircuit
TechLinked
Channel Super Fun
LMG Clips
Mac Address
They're Just Movies (ended December 30, 2022; formerly titled Carpool Critics)

Personal life
Linus Gabriel Sebastian was born on August 20, 1986, and grew up in Maple Ridge, British Columbia. He was diagnosed with ADHD as a child. He grew up on a farm with siblings and has been married to Yvonne Ho since May 20, 2011. In a 2014 interview with technology startup website Tech.co, Sebastian said that his favourite YouTubers were TotalBiscuit, Marques Brownlee, and Austin Evans. In January 2020, Sebastian claimed he was thinking about retiring. However, he has subsequently said that helping in projects besides video production has helped him stay innovative.

See also
 Louis Rossmann, who has collaborated with Linus Sebastian on technology-videos and electronics right to repair campaigns

Notes

References

External links

 

1986 births
Living people
Canadian YouTubers
Canadian bloggers
YouTube vloggers
People from Surrey, British Columbia
Technology YouTubers
Twitch (service) streamers